During the 1995–96 English football season, Norwich City F.C. competed in the Football League First Division.

Season summary
Martin O'Neill, who had taken Wycombe Wanderers from the Conference to the Second Division with successive promotions, was appointed as Norwich City manager in the summer of 1995. He lasted just six months in the job before resigning after a dispute with chairman Robert Chase over Chase's refusal to permit O'Neill to spend significant sums on strengthening the squad. Soon after O'Neill's resignation, Chase stepped down after protests from supporters, who complained that he kept selling the club's best players and was to blame for the relegation.  Indeed, between 1992 and January 1995, Norwich sold a number of key attacking players: Robert Fleck (for £2.1M), Ruel Fox (for £2.25M), Chris Sutton (for £5M),  Efan Ekoku (£0.9M) and Mark Robins (£1M). Nearly 40 years after being instrumental in saving the club from bankruptcy, Geoffrey Watling bought Chase's majority shareholding. Gary Megson was appointed Norwich manager on a temporary basis for the second time in eight months. Megson remained in charge until the end of the season before leaving the club.  Just four seasons after finishing third in the Premiership and beating Bayern Munich in the UEFA Cup, Norwich had finished 16th in Division One.

Final league table

Results
Norwich City's score comes first

Legend

Football League First Division

FA Cup

League Cup

Players

First-team squad
Squad at end of season

Notes

References

Norwich City F.C. seasons
Norwich City